The Black Reel Award for Outstanding Film is one of the Black Reel Awards presented annually. This award goes to the producers of the film. Outstanding Film is the final award of the night at each ceremony. There have been 115 films nominated for Outstanding Film and 23 winners.

History

Outstanding Film and Outstanding Director
The Black Reel Award for Outstanding Picture and Black Reel Award for Outstanding Director have been closely linked throughout their history. Of the 22 films that have won Outstanding Film, 10 have also been awarded for Outstanding Director. Only six films have been awarded Outstanding Film without receiving an Outstanding Director nomination: The Hurricane directed by Norman Jewison , Ray directed by Taylor Hackford (2005), Crash directed by Paul Haggis (2006), Dreamgirls directed by Bill Condon (2017), The Help directed by Tate Taylor (2012) and Dolemite Is My Name directed by Craig Brewer (2020).  Note: These film directors were deemed ineligible for an Outstanding Director nomination due to not being of African-American of African descent.

Language and country of origin
Only one non-English language film has been nominated in the category: The Intouchables (French, 2013). Five films wholly financed outside of the United States has been nominated for Outstanding Film: Attack the Block (2011), Shame (2011), The Intouchables (2013), Mandela: Long Walk to Freedom (2013) & Belle (2014).

Genres
The Princess and the Frog and Soul are the only animated films to be nominated for Outstanding Film. Black Panther remains as the only Comic Book film to be nominated and win Outstanding Film. Get Out became the first horror film to win Outstanding Film and one of three films along with From Hell and Us to be nominated in this category.

Lightning in a Bottle is the only documentary film to win. It won in the first and only winner in the Outstanding Comedy/Musical film at the 5th Annual Black Reel Awards. Standing in the Shadows of Motown, Tupac: Resurrection, Fade to Black and 13th were the other documentaries to be nominated in this category.

Dreamgirls is the only musical to win this category. To date, The Book of Eli and Attack the Block are the only two Sci-Fi films to be nominated for Outstanding Film.

Winners and nominees
Winners are listed first and highlighted in bold.

2000s

2010s

2020s

Multiple nominations and wins

Multiple wins
 3 Wins
 Dede Gardner
 Jeremy Kleiner

Multiple nominations

 8 nominations
 Spike Lee

6 Nominations 
 James Lassiter

 5 Nominations
 Todd Black
 Will Smith

 4 Nominations
 Dede Gardner
 Jeremy Kleiner
 Denzel Washington

 3 Nominations
 Stephanie Allain
 Jason Blum
 David Gale 
 Jon Kilik 
 Sean McKittrick
 Jordan Peele
 Robert Teitel

 2 Nominations
 Howard Barish 
 Nina Yang Bongiovi
 Jason Blumenthal
 Iain Canning 
 Don Cheadle
 Lee Daniels
 John Davis 
 Ava DuVernay
 Megan Ellison 
 Brian Grazer
 Reginald Hudlin
 Broderick Johnson
 Charles D. King 
 Andrew A. Kosove
 Laurence Mark
 Steve McQueen
 Arnon Milchan
 Neal H. Moritz 
 Eddie Murphy
 Gil Netter
 Adele Romanski
 Scott Rudin
 Emile Sherman 
 John Singleton
 Jeffrey Silver 
 George Tillman Jr. 
 Steve Tisch 
 Lena Waithe
 James Wilson 
 Forest Whitaker

Production companies with multiple nominations and wins

References

Black Reel Awards